Villa Lidköping BK is a bandy club in Lidköping i Sweden. The club was formed on January 18, 1934 as Villa BK on Lockörn outside Lidköping, where the old club cottage still is. The club's name comes from the nearby country estate Villa Giacomina.

Villa has played in the Swedish championship finals six times, losing 4 out of the 6 appearances in the years 1975, 1983, 2012 and 2016 before finally winning in 2019 and again in 2021. Home games are played in Sparbanken Lidköping Arena.

In October 2018, the club won its first World Cup title. The women's team won the Swedish national championship for first time during the 2020–2021 season and again during the 2021–2022 and 2022–2023 seasons.

The men's team won the Swedish Cup in the years 2016, 2020, 2021 and 2022. The women's team won the Swedish Cup in the years 2020 and 2021.

Squad

Honours

Domestic
 Swedish National Champions:
 Winner (2): 2019, 2021
 Runners-up (5): 1975, 1983, 2012, 2016, 2020
 Swedish Cup:
 Winner (4): 2016, 2020, 2021, 2022
 Runners-up (1): 2008

International
 World Cup:
 Winner (1): 2018
 Runners-up (1): 2016

References

External links

 
Bandy clubs in Sweden
Bandy clubs established in 1934
1934 establishments in Sweden
Sport in Lidköping